

The Dewoitine D.19 was a fighter aircraft built in France in 1925 in response to a French Air Force solicitation.

Design and development
A development of the D.1, the D.19 shared the D.1's parasol-wing configuration, but featured an all-new wing of increased span, and had double the engine power. Although rejected by the French Air Force, a demonstration for the Swiss government in August 1925 led to an order for three aircraft. An additional example was sold to Belgium, incorporating the same changes requested by the Swiss. These included a change in the wing (changing back to become more similar to the D.1), and the replacement of the Lamblin radiators with a more conventional frontal radiator.

Operational history
While the first Swiss D.19 was entirely constructed by Dewoitine in France, the remaining two aircraft were supplied to be assembled by the Swiss factory EKW. The aircraft were used for many years by the Swiss Fliegertruppe as trainers for fighter pilots, remaining in service until 1940. All three participated in the international aviation meet at Dübendorf in 1927, with one of the D.19s winning the closed-circuit race.

Operators

Belgian Air Force

Swiss Air Force

Civil registration L-BYSA

Specifications (D.19 C.1)

References

Further reading
 

1920s French fighter aircraft
D.019
Parasol-wing aircraft
Single-engined tractor aircraft
Aircraft first flown in 1925